Zardeh (also known as Razdeh and Zarde) is a village in Fash Rural District, in the Central District of Kangavar County, Kermanshah Province, Iran. At the 2006 census, its population was 75, in 18 families.

References 

Populated places in Kangavar County